The Santa Catalina Mountains, commonly referred to as the Catalina Mountains or the Catalinas, are north and northeast of Tucson in Arizona, United States, on Tucson's north perimeter. The mountain range is the most prominent in the Tucson area, with the highest average elevation.

Originally known by the Tohono O'odham Nation as Babad Do'ag, the Catalinas were later named in 1697 by Italian Jesuit priest Eusebio Francisco Kino in honor of St. Catherine who was the patron saint of Kino's oldest sister.

The Catalinas are part of the Santa Catalina Ranger District located in the Coronado National Forest, and also include the Pusch Ridge Wilderness Area. The mountain range is considered a prominent range in the Madrean sky islands, and partially delimits the mountain ranges in the northwest of the sky island region; lower elevation bajadas associated with the Santa Cruz River Valley spread northwestwards towards Phoenix.

Catalina Sky Survey (CSS), on Mt. Lemmon, is a project to discover comets and asteroids, and to search for near-Earth objects (NEOs). More specifically, CSS is to search for any potentially hazardous asteroids that may pose a threat of impact. Its southern hemisphere counterpart, the Siding Spring Survey (SSS) was closed in 2013.

The Catalinas are a significant focus of recreational activity, with areas such as Sabino Canyon providing streams and perennial pools for visitors, by road access; Sabino Canyon is also a dayhiking access point. Catalina State Park in the western foothills of the Catalinas attracts visitors for its hiking opportunities and permanent pools in Romero Canyon. The village of Summerhaven on Mount Lemmon serves as a popular summer retreat from the heat of Arizona's lower deserts.  Mount Lemmon Ski Valley is also notable as it is the southernmost ski destination in the United States.

Other mountain ranges surrounding the Santa Cruz Valley include the Santa Rita Mountains, the Rincon Mountains, the Tucson Mountains, and the Tortolita Mountains.

Name
The Catalinas were originally named the "Sierra de la Santa Catarina" as depicted on a German map from 1875 or "Santa Catrina Mountains" as in a prior map dating back to 1864.  A successive map from 1890 still referred to the Catalinas as the "Santa Catarina Mountains."  However, a map from 1895 depicted the range with the name "Santa Catalina." Various maps during the 1880s and 1890s referred to the range as either "Santa Catarina" or "Santa Catalina."  However, by 1902 the range was officially designated the "Santa Catalina Mountains," as the General Land Office established the Santa Catalina Forest Reserve that year, encompassing 155,520 acres (later to become the Santa Catalina National Forest.)  As such, the name of the range apparently morphed into the current "Santa Catalina Mountains" sometime between 1890 and 1902, but each previous version of the name always referred to the namesake St. Catherine.

National Forest
Following the Gadsden Purchase, Americans increasingly moved into the Arizona Territory and focused on the Catalinas in search of gold, silver, and copper beginning in the 1850s.  By the late 1880s, residents of southern Arizona desired protection for the Catalinas, and the U.S. Congress authorized the President to designate specific lands around the U.S. to be removed from the public domain under the Forest Reserve Act of 1891.  As mentioned above, the Santa Catalina Forest Reserve was created on July 2, 1902, and after the National Forest Service was organized in 1905, the reserve became the Santa Catalina National Forest on March 4, 1907.  On July 1, 1908, it was combined with two other nearby national forests (Dragoon and Santa Rita) to create the present Coronado National Forest.

Notable sites and areas

Mountains and ridges
 Cathedral Rock
 Mount Bigelow
 Mount Kimball
 Mount Lemmon: highest point
 Pusch Ridge: westernmost point
 Rattlesnake Peak
 Table Mountain
 Thimble Peak
 Window Peak

Canyons
 Bear Canyon
 Box Camp Canyon
 Cañada del Oro: north of Mount Lemmon
 Esperero Canyon
 Molino Canyon
 Pima Canyon: southeast of Pusch Ridge
 Romero Canyon: located in Catalina State Park
 Sabino Canyon
 Ventana Canyon

Other
 Arizona Trail
 Rose Canyon Lake
 Catalina Highway
 Catalina State Park
 Pusch Ridge Wilderness Area
 Redington Pass
 Summerhaven
 Tanque Verde Falls
 Peppersauce Cave

Miscellaneous facts
 Mount Lemmon is not the highest point in the Tucson area.  Mount Wrightson in the nearby Santa Rita Mountains has an elevation of 9,453 feet (2,881 m).
 It is the type locality of a species of Noctuidae or owlet moths (see List of butterflies and moths of Arizona)
 Mount Lemmon is named after Sara Lemmon, a plant collector and the first white woman to ascend the peak in the 1881.
 Mercer Spring, located at the Molino Basin Campground on Mount Lemmon,  is named for rancher Dell Mercer who had a ranch at the basin at one point.
 Sollers Road, Sollers Point and Sollers Cabin, all on Mount Lemmon are named in honor of a fallen forest ranger named Carl Sollers.
 Barnum Rock, a large rock formation, near San Pedro Vista, once used as a fire lookout and now used for rock climbing, is named for Willis E. Barnum Sr. a former Boy Scout Commissioner.

Gallery

References

External links

 Forest History Society
 Listing of the National Forests of the United States and Their Dates (from the Forest History Society website) Text from Davis, Richard C., ed. Encyclopedia of American Forest and Conservation History. New York: Macmillan Publishing Company for the Forest History Society, 1983. Vol. II, pp. 743–788.''
 Coronado National Forest
 Catalinas: Desert to Sky Island

 
Madrean Sky Islands mountain ranges
Mountain ranges of Arizona
Mountain ranges of Pima County, Arizona
Mountain ranges of Pinal County, Arizona
Coronado National Forest